Enforcers is a role-playing game published by 21st Century Games in 1987.

Description
Enforcers is a near future (2046) superhero system. The rules cover characters, combat, and running a campaign. Character creation uses a flexible points-purchase-powers system. A calculator is required, as math formulas figure prominently in the rules.

Publication history
Enforcers was designed by Gary Bernard, Charles Mann, and Larry Troth, with art by Christine Mansfield, and was published by 21st Century Games in 1987 as a 112-page book with a blue cover. The second edition was published the same year with a yellow cover, although it says 1st edition on the title page.

The game featured two adventures, The End of a Legend and Knights of Beverly Hills.

Reception
Stewart Wieck reviewed the second edition of Enforcers for White Wolf #11, rating it 8 out of 10 overall, and stated that "Enforcers combined several of the elements of earlier independent super-hero RPGs into a cohesive whole."

Reviews
StarDrive #1 (Jan 1988)

References

Role-playing games introduced in 1987
Superhero role-playing games